Sambia is a peninsula in Prussia (Russian Kaliningrad Oblast).

Sambia may also refer to:
Sambia, Comoros, a town on the island of Mohéli in the Comoros
Sambia (Papua New Guinea), a tribe of people in the Eastern Highlands Province of Papua New Guinea

See also
Sambians, an extinct Old Prussian tribe
Zambia, a country in Africa